Princess Mathilde of Saxony, Duchess of Saxony (19 March 1863 – 27 March 1933) was the third child and third-eldest daughter of George of Saxony and his wife, Infanta Maria Anna of Portugal.  She was an elder sister of the Kingdom of Saxony's last king, Frederick Augustus III of Saxony.

Life
As a young girl, Mathilde was quiet and gentle, but she was not especially good-looking. Her father, George of Saxony, had planned a marriage between Mathilde and Archduke Rudolf, Crown Prince of Austria, Hungary, and Bohemia, however Rudolf rejected this arrangement and instead married Princess Stéphanie of Belgium.

It was then agreed that Mathilde would marry a nephew of Emperor Franz Joseph I and the presumptive heir to the Austro-Hungarian throne, Archduke Franz Ferdinand. However, Franz Ferdinand rejected this arrangement.  Dynastic relations between the Saxon royal family and the Habsburgs were once again strained when Franz Ferdinand chose to marry (morganatically) Sophie, Countess Chotek von Wognin. Relations between the two nations improved only when Mathilde's younger sister Maria Josepha married her second cousin, Archduke Otto Franz of Austria.

Mathilde became embittered by these rejections and turned critical and waspish; she also turned to alcohol to ease her unhappiness, acquiring the nickname "Schnapps-Mathilde" for obvious reasons. She made life difficult for other members of the royal family, and as a consequence was the least popular of the family by a wide margin among the people of Saxony.

She was a talented painter and took lessons from the artist Alfred Diethe from 1890 to 1901. Some of her paintings, mainly landscapes and scenes of court life in Pillnitz, were made into prints.  Others appeared on postcards, which were sold to raise money for charity.

Mathilde died unmarried on 27 March 1933 at the age of 70. She was interred in the New Tomb of the Katholische Hofkirche in Dresden.

Ancestry

References

1863 births
1933 deaths
House of Wettin
Saxon princesses
Dames of the Order of Saint Isabel
Burials at Dresden Cathedral
Nobility from Dresden
German Roman Catholics
Albertine branch
Artists from Dresden
Daughters of kings